Francis Megahy (18 March 1935 – 1 May 2020) was a British film director.

Filmography
Freelance (1971)
The Great Riviera Bank Robbery (1979)
Flashpoint Africa (1980)
Real Life (1984)
Taffin (1988)

References

External links
 

1935 births
2020 deaths
People from Manchester
Deaths from cancer in California
British expatriates in the United States
British film directors